Wendelsheim is a suburban district of Rottenburg am Neckar in the administrative district of Tübingen in Baden-Württemberg (Germany).

Geography 

Wendelsheim is located 4 km (2.5 mi) northern from Rottenburg and 11 km (6.8 mi) southwestern from Tübingen.

Extent 

The area of the district is 470 hectares. Thereof fall 71.0% upon agriculturally used area, 15.1% upon forest area, 13.6% upon settlement area and roads, 0.2% upon water expanse and 0.2% upon other.

Neighbour localities 

The territories of the following localities adjoin to Wendelsheim, they are called clockwise beginning in the north: Oberndorf, Wurmlingen, Rottenburg (town), Seebronn. All bordering localities are in the administrative district of Tübingen, and all are part of the Town of Rottenburg.

Population 

Wendelsheim has 1555 inhabitants (31/01/08). It is one of the largest suburbs of Rottenburg. At an area of 4.70 km² (1.8 sq mi) this corresponds to a population density of 331 people per km², or 857 per sq mi.

Faiths 

The population is predominantly Roman Catholic.

Politics

Sister village 
 Ablis (Île-de-France) since 1979

References

External links 
 Official Webpage (German)

Rottenburg am Neckar